Gordon Wiles (October 10, 1904 – October 17, 1950) was an American art director and film director. He won an Oscar for Best Art Direction for the film Transatlantic. He was born in St. Louis, Missouri. His father, Albert Wiles, was a doctor in Jerseyville, Illinois.

Selected filmography
 Transatlantic (art director; 1931)
 Almost Married (art director; 1932)
 Lady from Nowhere (director; 1936)
 Charlie Chan's Secret (director; 1936)
 Venus Makes Trouble (director; 1937)
 Prison Train (director; 1938)
 Mr. Boggs Steps Out (director; 1938)
 Forced Landing (director; 1941)
 The Gangster (director; 1947)

References

External links

1904 births
1950 deaths
American film directors
American art directors
Film directors from Missouri
Artists from St. Louis
Best Art Direction Academy Award winners